Portrait of Greta Moll is a painting by Henri Matisse from 1908. It is part of the National Gallery collection in London. In 2019 it moved to Perth Museum in Scotland.

External links
 Portrait of Greta Moll at the National Gallery website (includes image).
 Portrait of Greta Moll at the Tate Modern website.

1908 paintings
Paintings by Henri Matisse
Collections of the National Gallery, London
Portraits of women